Myosotis stricta is a plant species of the genus Myosotis. Common names include strict forget-me-not and blue scorpion grass.

References

stricta
Flora of Michigan
Flora without expected TNC conservation status